Complexo Desportivo Adega is a multi-purpose stadium in the Achada Grande Trás section of Praia, Cape Verde. It is currently used mostly for football matches and athletics competitions, much of the football (soccer) training are used for practices. It is the home base of several athletic clubs playing at the regional level.

Its location is in the east of the island just a kilometer north of the country's busiest port and is connected with the circular bypass that also connects with the road to Assomada and Cidade Velha.

Several football (soccer) clubs including Boavista and Sporting Praia practices at the complex, before the soccer matches.

Athletic competitions take places at the complex, the Santiago South Zone Athletic Championships takes places each season.  One of the teams include Travadores participating at the complex.

See also
List of buildings and structures in Santiago, Cape Verde

References 

Football venues in Cape Verde
Athletics (track and field) venues in Cape Verde
Multi-purpose stadiums
Sport in Praia
Buildings and structures in Praia
Sports venues in Santiago, Cape Verde
Sports venues completed in 2012
Association football training grounds in Cape Verde
Boavista FC (Cape Verde)
Sporting Clube da Praia
CD Travadores